Episcepsis obsoleta is a moth of the family Erebidae. It was described by Hermann Burmeister in 1878. It is found in Argentina.

References

 

Euchromiina
Moths described in 1878